Vesela Yordanova Kazakova (born 4 July 1977) is a Bulgarian actress, screenwriter, director and producer. She is best known for her roles in Mila from Mars (2004) and Stolen Eyes (2005), as well as for her cinematography on films such as Cat in the Wall (2019) and Women Do Cry (2021) alongside directing partner Mina Mileva.

Life and career
Kazakova was born on 4 July 1976 in Sofia. She first appeared on stage at the age of four with her twin sister Bilyana. Both were part of the Kambana children's theatre troupe, founded by their mother Snezhina Kazakova, who was also an actress. She majored in theater at the National Academy for Theatre and Film Arts in the class of Stefan Danailov. While still a student, she made her professional debut in the plays Antigone, produced by Margarita Mladenova, and in The Night Of Rock'n'Roll, directed by Ivaylo Hristov at Theatre 199. In 2000, she played the role of Nina in The Seagull by Anton Chekhov.

In this period, she gained an interest in producing independent theatre plays. For her performances in Stereolove and Nightsongs, she acted as project manager, co-writer, composer and actress. In 2003, she graduated from the University of National and World Economy in Sofia.

In 2001, she played her first major film role in List otbrulen (A Leaf in the Wind), directed by Svetoslav Ovcharov. For her role as a silent young girl, she won the Nevena Kokanova prize for best young actress at the Bulgarian Golden Rose Feature Film Festival in Varna in 2002.

Kazakova has won more than ten awards at Bulgarian and international festivals. In 2019, she directed Cat in the Wall alongside Mina Mileva. The film was presented in the official competition of the Locarno Film Festival and at South by Southwest in the United States. It received the FIPRESCI prize from the Warsaw Film Festival.

In 2021, she paired up with Mileva again to direct Women Do Cry. This film was selected to compete in the Un Certain Regard section at the Cannes Film Festival, and was also screened at South by Southwest and the Glasgow Film Festival.

Selected filmography

References

External links 
 
 

1976 births
Living people
Actresses from Sofia
20th-century Bulgarian actresses
21st-century Bulgarian actresses
Bulgarian film actresses
Bulgarian stage actresses
Bulgarian voice actresses
National Academy for Theatre and Film Arts alumni
University of National and World Economy alumni